Bray Youth Choir is a choir based in Bray, County Wicklow, Republic of Ireland. The choir was founded in October 2004 by Frank Kelly.  They have performed in many concerts around Europe in association with the Bray Choral Society. The Bray Youth Choir performed their first solo concert in St Fergal's church in Bray, Saturday April 24, at 8.15 p.m. The concert was conducted by Frank Kelly and the pieces performed were Vavaldi's Gloria Antonio Vivaldi and a variety of popular songs, traditional airs and negro spirituals from the 'Deep South'.
The Bray Youth Choir also appeared on an RTÉ show with Dustin the Turkey on 25 November 2007. This was broadcast all across the country. They have also appeared on national TV on the programme: An Cór. Their concerts have been advertised many times in Wicklow's local newspaper the Bray People. List of newspapers in Ireland

External links
Bray Youth Choir Plan a Solo Concert, The Bray People, Wednesday April 14, 2010
Frank has his Choirs Singing to the Masses, Bray People, Wednesday October 7, 2009
Bray Youth Choir All Set For TV, The Bray people 22 November 2007

References

Irish choirs
Musical groups established in 2004